Acacia retivenea, commonly known as the net-veined wattle, is a shrub of the genus Acacia and the subgenus Plurinerves that is endemic across northern Australia.

Description
Like most species of Acacia it has phyllodes rather than true leaves. It blooms from April to October and produces yellow flowers.

Taxonomy
The species was first formally described by the botanist Ferdinand von Mueller in 1863 as part of the work Fragmenta Phytographiae Australiae. It was reclassified as Racosperma retiveneum by Leslie Pedley in 1987 ten transferred back to genus Acacia in 2001. The only other synonym is Acacia retivenia as described by George Bentham in 1863.
There are two recognised subspecies:
Acacia retivenea subsp. clandestina
Acacia retivenea subsp. retivenea

Distribution
It is native to an area in the Kimberley, Pilbara  and northern Goldfields-Esperance regions of Western Australia where it is commonly situated along creek beds, on rocky sites and hillsides growing in sandy or loamy soils. The range of the shrub extends from around Fitzroy Crossing in the south west to around the Wunaamin-Miliwundi Ranges in the northwest extending eastwards into the Northern Territory and across the top end to around Mount Isa in central Queensland with some outlying populations around Pine Creek, Northern Territory and the Reynolds Range in the Northern Territory and Torrens Creek in Queensland. It is usually part of tall shrubland or low open woodland communities and is usually found with Eucalyptus brevifolia and species of Triodia.

See also
List of Acacia species

References

retivenea
Acacias of Western Australia
Taxa named by Ferdinand von Mueller
Plants described in 1863
Flora of the Northern Territory
Flora of Queensland